The 1962 Indian parliamentary resolution on China is the resolution passed by the Parliament of India on 14 November 1962. The unanimous resolution adopted during Sino-Indian War pledged to get back the territory occupied by Chinese  to the last inch. The full text of the resolution is :

"This House notes with deep regret that, in spite of the uniform gestures of goodwill and friendship by India towards the People's Government of China on the basis of recognition of each other's independence, non-aggression and non-interference, and peaceful co-existence, China has betrayed this goodwill and friendship and the principles of [[Five Principles of Peaceful Coexistence
The panchsheel|Panchsheel]] which had been agreed to between the two countries and has committed aggression and initiated a massive invasion of India by her armed forces.

"This House places on record its high appreciation of the valiant struggle of man and officers of our armed forces while defending our frontiers and pays its respectful homage to the martyrs who have laid down their lives in defending the honour and integrity of our motherland.

"This House also records its profound appreciation of the wonderful and spontaneous response of the people of India to the emergency and crisis that has resulted from China's invasion of India.

"It notes with deep gratitude this mighty upsurge amongst all sections of our people for harnessing all our resources towards the organisation of an all-out effort to meet this grave national emergency. 

The flame of liberty and sacrifice has been kindled anew and a fresh dedication has taken place to the cause of India's freedom and integrity.

"This House gratefully acknowledges the sympathy and the moral and material support received from a large number of friendly countries in this grim hour of our struggle against aggression and invasion.

"With hope and faith, this House affirms the firm resolve of the Indian people to drive out the aggressor from the sacred soil of India, however long and hard the struggle may be".

References

Parliament of India
Sino-Indian War
Resolutions (law)
1962 in India
1962 documents